Harold Hooper may refer to:

 Harry Hooper (footballer, born 1900) (Harold Hooper, 1900–1963), defender with Leicester City, Southampton and Queens Park Rangers
 Harry Hooper (footballer, born 1933) (Harold Hooper), winger with West Ham United, Wolverhampton Wanderers, Birmingham City and Sunderland
 Harold Ridley Hooper (1886–1953), English architect
 Mr. Hooper (Harold Hooper), a character on Sesame Street

See also
Harry Hooper (disambiguation)